Gracia C. Martore is the former president and CEO of Tegna, Inc. and was CEO of the predecessor Gannett Company before its split. She was succeeded by Dave Lougee on 1 June 2017. She replaced Craig Dubow on 6 October 2011.
She serves on the Board of Directors of FM Global and MeadWestvaco Corporation.

Education and early career
Martore graduated from Wellesley College in 1973  with a double major in history and political science. While at Wellesley she was named a  Scholar for academic excellence. She worked for 12 years in the banking industry before joining Gannett. In 2010 Ms. Martore's total  compensation was estimated  by  Forbes to be over eight million dollars.

Awards
In a 2011 review of the world's most powerful women Martore was cited by Forbes. She was also named one of Washington's 100 Most Powerful Women by Washingtonian Magazine. Institutional Investor magazine named her one of the best CFOs in America and ranked her the Best CFO in America in the publishing and advertising agencies category for three years in a row (2004, 2005 and 2006). The Washington Post named her one of the top 10 female executives at major companies in the Washington region. In 2006 she was named CFO of the Year by Virginia Business.

References 

Living people
American chairpersons of corporations
20th-century American businesspeople
American media executives
American corporate directors
American chief financial officers
Gannett people
American women chief executives
Women corporate directors
21st-century American businesspeople
Wellesley College alumni
American bankers
Women bankers
Women chief financial officers
Year of birth missing (living people)
20th-century American businesswomen
21st-century American businesswomen